Igor Valentinovich Kozlov (born 7 August 1970) is a former Russian professional footballer.

Club career
He made his professional debut in the Soviet Second League in 1989 for FC Chaika-CSKA Moscow. He played 1 game in the UEFA Cup 1991–92 for FC Spartak Moscow.

Honours
 Soviet Top League runner-up: 1990, 1991.
 Soviet Cup winner: 1991 (played in the early stages of the 1990/91 tournament for PFC CSKA Moscow), 1992.

References

1970 births
Footballers from Moscow
Living people
Soviet footballers
Russian footballers
Association football midfielders
FC Spartak Moscow players
PFC CSKA Moscow players
K.S.K. Beveren players
FC Zenit Saint Petersburg players
FC Khimki players
FC Vityaz Podolsk players
Soviet Top League players
Russian Premier League players
Belgian Pro League players
Russian expatriate footballers
Expatriate footballers in Belgium